was a district located in Fukuoka Prefecture, Japan.

Description
The cities once part of the district:
 Munakata
 Fukutsu
Now dissolved towns located in Munakata District:
 Fukuma - Now part of the city of Fukutsu
 Genkai - Now part of the city of Munakata
 Ōshima - Now part of the city of Munakata
 Tsuyazaki - Now part of the city of Fukutsu

District Timeline
 On April 1, 2003 - the town of Genkai was merged into the expanded city of Munakata.
 On January 24, 2005 - the towns of Fukuma and Tsuyazaki were merged to create the city of Fukutsu.
 On March 28, 2005 - the village of Ōshima was merged into the expanded city of Munakata. Munakata District was dissolved as a result of this merger.

Former districts of Fukuoka Prefecture